Associazione Calcio M.M. Sarego Associazione Sportiva Dilettantistica or simply Sarego is an Italian association football club, based in Sarego, Veneto.

Sarego currently plays in Eccellenza.

History

From Monticello di Fara to M.M. Sarego
The club was founded in 1969 as A.S. Monticello di Fara in the local fraction of Sarego and it was renamed in 1975 as A.S. La Favorita.

M.M. Sarego
In the summer of 1989 the team was refounded, after the merger with the citizen club of the fraction of Meledo, with the current denomination (M.M. are the initials of the fractions of the teams that have merged).

In the season 2010–11 it was promoted from Eccellenza Veneto A to Serie D.

In the season 2011–12 it was relegated to Eccellenza.

Colors and badge
The team's colors are yellow and black.

References

External links
Official Site

Football clubs in Italy
Football clubs in Veneto
Association football clubs established in 1969
1969 establishments in Italy